Surrey House, in Norwich, England, is the historic home of the insurance company Aviva (formerly Norwich Union) and a Grade I listed building.

It is an example of Edwardian architecture designed by George Skipper and built between 1900 and 1912. Skipper was commissioned by The Norwich Union Life Insurance Society's directors to produce a 'splendid yet functional office space', incorporating Greek influences and the themes of insurance, protection and wellbeing, to reassure policyholders of the company's strength and prosperity.

The building has a Palladian exterior and an interior adorned with 15 varieties of marble, classically inspired frescos and a glass atrium. It also contains unusual items such as an 'air fountain' and a chiming skeleton clock made for he Great Exhibition of 1851.

It is one of the Norwich 12 buildings.

References

Buildings and structures in Norwich
Grade I listed buildings in Norfolk
George Skipper buildings